Rocky Mount Historic District is a national historic district located at Rocky Mount, Franklin County, Virginia. It encompasses 211 contributing buildings, 2 contributing sites (Mary Elizabeth Park and High Street Cemetery), 1 contributing site, and 2 contributing objects in the central business district and surround residential areas of Rocky Mount, county seat of Franklin County. It includes residential, commercial, institutional, and governmental buildings dated from the early- to mid-19th through early 20th centuries. Notable buildings include the Rakes Building (1929), N&W Freight Depot (c. 1907), Mount Pleasant (1828–1829), The Taliaffero Building (1827–1828), The Grove (1850), McCall House (c. 1907), Lodge Rooms (Colored) (c. 1900), Trinity Episcopal Church (c. 1874), Rocky Mount Presbyterian Church (c. 1880), Baptist Church (Colored) (c. 1907), N. Morris Department Store / Bryd Balm Company (c. 1912), Franklin County Courthouse (1909), Franklin County Jail (1938), Franklin County Library (1940), Rocky Mount Municipal Building (1929), and a Lustron house known as the Davis House (1949). Located in the district and separately listed are the Woods-Meade House and the Greer House.

It was listed on the National Register of Historic Places in 1999, with a boundary increase in 2008.

Gallery

References

External links

Historic districts in Franklin County, Virginia
National Register of Historic Places in Franklin County, Virginia
Historic districts on the National Register of Historic Places in Virginia